Richard Edwin Hills  (30 September 1945 – 5 June 2022) was a British astronomer who was emeritus professor of Radio Astronomy at the University of Cambridge.

Education
Born on 30 September 1945 and educated at Bedford School, Hills studied the Natural Science Tripos at Queens' College, Cambridge and then went to the University of California, Berkeley to complete his Doctor of Philosophy degree.

Career and research
Hills was a research scientist at the Max Planck Institute in Bonn between 1972 and 1974, before he returned to the University of Cambridge and became involved in the development of telescopes and instrumentation for astronomy at wavelengths of around one millimetre—the spectral region that lies between radio waves and infrared—which is relatively unexplored.

Hills worked as the project scientist for the James Clerk Maxwell Telescope during its design and construction, and went on to use the telescope to observe distant, redshifted quasars and the processes associated with star formation. In December 2007 he was appointed project scientist for the ALMA telescope, a sub-millimeter interferometer in the Atacama Desert of Northern Chile.

Hills was a fellow of St Edmund's College, Cambridge and Director of Studies for Natural Sciences at St Edmund's between 1990 and 2007. He was Professor of Radio Astronomy at the University of Cambridge between 1990 and 2007, Deputy Head of the Department of Physics at the University of Cambridge between 1999 and 2003, and was emeritus professor of Radio Astronomy at the University of Cambridge until his death on 5 June 2022.

Awards and honours
Hills was awarded the Royal Astronomical Society's Jackson-Gwilt Medal in 1989, was part of the team given the MacRobert Award for Engineering in 1990 and was elected as a Fellow of the Royal Society (FRS) in 2014. His nomination for the Royal Society reads:

References

1945 births
2022 deaths
20th-century British astronomers
21st-century British astronomers
People educated at Bedford School
Alumni of Queens' College, Cambridge
Fellows of the Royal Astronomical Society
Fellows of the Royal Society